In Salah is a district in Tamanrasset Province, Algeria. It was named after its capital, In Salah (Tamanrasset Province). According to the 2008 census, it has a population of 39,167.

Municipalities
The district is further divided into 2 municipalities:
In Salah
Foggaret Ezzaouia

References

Districts of Tamanrasset Province